The Cleveland mayoral special election of 1962 saw the election of incumbent mayor Ralph S. Locher, who became mayor after Anthony J. Celebrezze resigned as mayor in 1962 to serve as United States Secretary of Health, Education, and Welfare under President John F. Kennedy.

General election

References

Mayoral elections in Cleveland
Cleveland mayoral
Cleveland
November 1962 events in the United States
1960s in Cleveland
Cleveland
Cleveland 1962